Cristian Alberto Traverso  (born 17 April 1972 in San Martín, Buenos Aires Province) is a retired Argentine footballer who played for a number of clubs both in Argentina and Latin America, including Argentinos Juniors, Boca Juniors and Puebla.

Nicknamed "Tigre" Traverso was named the Chilean Footballer of the Year in 1995 while playing for Universidad de Chile, though despite this honour he never played for his country.

Honours

Club
Universidad de Chile
 Primera División de Chile (1): 1995

Boca Juniors
Primera División Argentina (3): 1998 Apertura, 1999 Clausura, 2000 Apertura
Copa Libertadores (2): 2000, 2001
Copa Intercontinental (1): 2000
Copa Sudamericana (1): 2004

External links
 Statistics at FutbolXXI.com 
 

1972 births
Living people
Sportspeople from Buenos Aires Province
Argentine people of Italian descent
Argentine footballers
Argentinos Juniors footballers
Boca Juniors footballers
Club Puebla players
Universidad de Chile footballers
Querétaro F.C. footballers
Argentine Primera División players
Chilean Primera División players
Liga MX players
Argentine expatriate footballers
Expatriate footballers in Chile
Expatriate footballers in Mexico
Association football defenders